Jan Prochyra (2 December 1948 - 20 May 2015) was a Polish actor, voice actor and stage director.

Life and career 
Born in Krakow, Prochyra graduated from the Krakow Academy of Dramatic Arts in 1974. He made his acting debut in 1968, and debuted as a stage director in 1977. Very active as a voice actor and a dubber, he was the Polish voice of Winnie the Pooh 's Eeyore and of The Jungle Book 's Baloo. Prochyra was the artistic director of the Rampa Theatre in Warsaw.

References

External links  
 

1948 births
2015 deaths 
Male actors from Kraków
Polish male film actors 
Polish male television actors
Polish male stage actors
Polish male voice actors
20th-century Polish male actors
21st-century Polish male actors